WEAC-CD, virtual channel 24 (UHF digital channel 35), is a low-powered, Class A FamilyNet-affiliated television station licensed to Anniston, Alabama, United States. The station is owned by Alabama Heritage Communications. WEAC maintains studio facilities on Highway 78 in Anniston, and its transmitter is located atop Coldwater Mountain in Oxford. The station is also currently available on 12 cable television systems, primarily across seven-county service area in eastern Alabama.

History

The station first signed on the air on December 29, 1994 as W24CB, which broadcast information for students, staff and visitors of Jacksonville State University. The station changed its call letters to WJXS-CA in 2002, as an affiliate of FamilyNet. On October 9, 2012, the station changed its call sign to WEAC-CA, and again to WEAC-CD on January 8, 2013.

Digital channel

Programming
In addition to FamilyNet programming, WEAC-CD also carries locally produced programs, including newscasts. WEAC-CD also carries sporting events including those from Jacksonville State University and local high schools. WEAC-CD currently produces more than 30 hours of original programming every week.

News operation
WEAC-CD presently broadcasts locally produced newscasts each week; the station does not produce any newscasts on weekends. WEAC-CD rebroadcasts its half-hour 9:00 and 10:00 p.m. newscasts Tuesday through Friday mornings at 6:00 and 7:00 a.m. In addition, the station produces a half-hour public affairs program, East Alabama Today, which airs 5:30pm on Tuesdays and Thursdays.

News team
News Anchors
 Carl Brady - anchor; weeknights at 9:00 and 10:00 p.m., also host of East Alabama Today
 Mike Stedham - anchor; fill-in

Weather team
 Chris Wright - meteorologist; weeknights at 9:00 and 10:00 p.m.
 Jon Holder - meteorologist; fill-in
 Sam Ford - meteorologist; fill-in

Sports team
 Gerhard Mathangani - sports director; sports anchor; weeknights at 9:00 and 10:00 p.m.
 Chase Robinson - sports anchor; fill-in
 Mickey Shadrix - host of Pigskin Roundup; also station manager
 Jon Holder - host of Pigskin Roundup

References

External links
 WEAC-CD official website
 

EAC-CD
Jacksonville State University
Television channels and stations established in 1994